The International Journal of Nanomedicine  is a peer-reviewed medical journal covering research on the application of nanotechnology in diagnostics, therapeutics, and drug delivery systems throughout the biomedical field. The journal was established in 2006 and is published by Dove Medical Press.

External links 
 

Dove Medical Press academic journals
English-language journals
Nanomedicine journals
Open access journals
Publications established in 2006